The Best of Bonnie Raitt is a 2003 compilation album by Bonnie Raitt, released by Capitol Records.

Reception
Thom Jurek of AllMusic wrote in his review, "Here is the astonishing range, from deep blue-eyed bluesy soul, sheeny reggae-tinged pop, and adult rock & roll that moves and inspires anyone with an open mind."

Track listing

References

External links
Bonnie Raitt Official Site
Capitol Records Official Site

2003 greatest hits albums
Bonnie Raitt compilation albums
Capitol Records compilation albums